The Congregation of the Sisters of the Good Samaritan, colloquially known as the "Good Sams", is a Roman Catholic congregation of religious women commenced by Bede Polding, OSB, Australia’s first Catholic bishop, in Sydney in 1857. The congregation was the first religious congregation to be founded in Australia. The sisters form an apostolic institute that follows the Rule of Saint Benedict. They take their name from the well-known gospel parable of the Good Samaritan.

History
Under the guidance of Polding’s co-founder, Mother Scholastica Gibbons, a Sister of Charity, the sisters cared for needy, homeless women at a refuge, the House of the Good Shepherd in Sydney, and orphans at the Roman Catholic Orphan School, a government institution at Parramatta. Foundations were made throughout Sydney and New South Wales as bishops urgently requested staff for Catholic schools. The first foundation outside New South Wales was made at Port Pirie, South Australia, in 1890. Under the leadership of Mother Berchmans, who was superior general from 1898 to 1916, the order expanded greatly, from nineteen communities to thirty nine, with expansion into four additional states. She added new congregations to serve the poor in urban areas like Brisbane and Melbourne, and set up missions in rural areas, such as the outback of Queensland and in farming communities in Victoria.  Over time, sisters have served in all states and territories of Australia.

During the first 100 years, education was a major focus of the sisters’ work. The work of the women’s refuge changed after World War I, when young women were referred from the Children’s Court to the care of the sisters at St Magdalen’s Arncliffe. A new ministry began in 1957 when Mater Dei Special School, Narellan opened at the request of the New South Wales bishops to provide a Catholic education for students with special needs.

Throughout the 1960s and 1970s, the sisters responded to the call of the Second Vatican Council to embrace the charism of their founder. They diversified their ministries to include catechetics, parish work, and support for Indigenous people, the elderly, the homeless, prisoners and people with disabilities. They also shared their rich Benedictine spirituality by giving retreats and spiritual direction. During this era, the education of students in the Good Samaritan schools and colleges became a shared ministry with lay people.

Increasingly, the congregation was called to listen to the needs of the wider Asia-Pacific region. Sisters went to Japan in 1948, in response to an appeal for help from the Bishop of Nagasaki. Initially, they established a dispensary to care for victims of the 1945 atomic bomb, but later went on to open a secondary school and kindergarten.

In a spirit of reconciliation with their Asian neighbours, the Good Samaritan Japanese sisters desired to begin a community in the Philippines. The community established in Bacolod in 1990, provides a kindergarten school for the children of the very poor. In 1991, the sisters began to work in Kiribati at the request of the local bishop and founded communities and a preschool centre.

In Australia, in 2011, the sisters’ ministry in Catholic education comprised ten schools in five dioceses: the Archdioceses of Brisbane, Melbourne and Sydney and the Dioceses of Broken Bay and Wollongong. The Congregation valued these schools as a sphere of its apostolic activity within the mission of the Church. In reading the signs of the times as they relate to the Good Samaritan Sisters and their schools, the congregation discerned that 2011 was the appropriate time to embrace a new and different future.

In 2011, the Sisters of the Good Samaritan received approval to establish Good Samaritan Education, a new entity within the Australian Catholic Church to oversee the canonical governance of the Congregation’s schools.

Today, about 235 Good Samaritan Sisters live and minister throughout Australia and in Japan, the Philippines and Kiribati. They and the wider Good Samaritan family continue to seek God and to live out the injunction of the Good Samaritan parable to be a good neighbour to those in need.

Sisters of the Good Samaritan

 Geraldine Scholastica Gibbons
 Clara Jane McLaughlin (Mother Berchmans)
 Bernice Moore
 Linda Cassell

Schools established by the Sisters of the Good Samaritan

Australia
New South Wales
Mater Dei School, Cobbitty (special school)
Mater Maria Catholic College, Warriewood, Sydney
Mount St Benedict College, Pennant Hills, Sydney
Rosebank College, Five Dock, Sydney
St Mary Star of the Sea College, Wollongong
St Patrick's College, Campbelltown, Sydney
St Scholastica's College, Glebe Point, Sydney
Stella Maris College, Manly, Sydney

Queensland
Lourdes Hill College, Hawthorne, Brisbane
St Margaret Mary's College, Hyde Park, Townsville
St Thomas' School, Camp Hill, *St Mary’s College Charters Towers, St Columba School Charters Towers ref></ref>

South Australia
Marymount College, Adelaide

Victoria
Mater Christi College, Belgrave, Melbourne
Santa Maria College, Northcote, Melbourne

See also
Wivenhoe, Narellan

References 

This article incorporates text from a publication by Marilyn Kelleher SGS, Annals of the Sisters of the Good Samaritan of the Order of St Benedict, published 2010, Volume II - 1938-1949, pp. 11–12.

External links
 Official Home Page of the Sisters of the Good Samaritan.
 Good Samaritan Day

Catholic female orders and societies
Catholic religious institutes established in the 19th century
Christian organizations established in the 1850s
Orders following the Rule of Saint Benedict